Lahcen Haddad ( - born 16 March 1960, Boujad) is a former Moroccan politician of the Popular Movement. From 3 January 2012, he held the position of Minister of Tourism in  the cabinet of Abdelilah Benkirane.

Currently, Lahcen Haddad is also a board member of The Parliamentary Network on the World Bank & International Monetary Fund.

See also
Cabinet of Morocco

References

External links
Ministry of Tourism
Official Twitter account

1960 births
Living people
Government ministers of Morocco
St. Thomas Aquinas College alumni
People from Boujad
Moroccan educators
Mohammed V University alumni
Indiana University Bloomington alumni
Popular Movement (Morocco) politicians